Geelong Galaxy United is an Australian Soccer club based in Geelong Australia. It is the only women's only soccer club in the Geelong region.

History 

The club was formed in 2016 and was an inaugural member of the National Premier Leagues Victoria Women (NPLW) in Victoria. 

In 2016 and 2017 the club made the NPLW grand final coming runners-up on both occasions. 

In 2019, the Senior team was relegated to the newly formed Victorian Premier League Women (VPLW). Reducing the NPLW to eight teams from the metropolitan Melbourne area.

Recent 
The club has moved from former home at Stead park, Norlane to Hume reserve in Bell Park  - the home ground of Corio Soccer Club.

References 

2016 establishments in Australia
Association football clubs established in 2016
Sport in Geelong
Soccer clubs in Victoria (Australia)
Women's soccer clubs in Australia